Arnold Theodore Spohr,  (December 23, 1923 – April 12, 2010) was a Canadian ballet dancer, choreographer, and artistic director.

Spohr was born in Rhein, Saskatchewan. From 1945 to 1954, he danced with the Royal Winnipeg Ballet, and was the artistic director of the company from 1958 to 1988, during which time he brought the company to international fame.

In 1970 he was made an Officer of the Order of Canada and was promoted to Companion in 2003. In 2000, he was awarded the Order of Manitoba. In 1998, Spohr received the Governor General's Performing Arts Award, Canada's highest honour in the performing arts, for his lifetime contribution to dance.

Spohr died on April 12, 2010 of chronic kidney disease in a Winnipeg long-term care centre at the age of 86.

Notes
An Instinct for Success: Arnold Spohr and the Royal Winnipeg Ballet by Michael Crabb

References

External links
 Arnold Theodore Spohr at The Canadian Encyclopedia
 Spohr, biography at Goethe Institute, (also possible in German, in French)

1923 births
2010 deaths
Canadian male ballet dancers
Companions of the Order of Canada
Deaths from kidney disease
Members of the Order of Manitoba
People from Saskatchewan
Ballet masters
Governor General's Performing Arts Award winners